J. Caleb Clanton is Professor of Philosophy at Lipscomb University. He taught previously at Vanderbilt University and Pepperdine University. Clanton is known for his research on philosophy of religion and moral philosophy.
He is the recipient of the Howard A. White Award for Teaching Excellence and the Lester McAllister Prize.

Books
 Philosophy of Religion in the Classical American Tradition, University of Tennessee Press, 2016
 The Philosophy of Religion of Alexander Campbell, University of Tennessee Press, 2013 (winner of the Lester McAllister Prize)
 The Classical American Pragmatists & Religion, Baylor University Press, 2011
 The Ethics of Citizenship, Baylor University Press, 2009
 Religion & Democratic Citizenship, Lexington Books, 2008

See also
 Alexander Campbell (clergyman)
 Andrew Forcehimes

References

External links
J. Caleb Clanton at Lipscomb University

1978 births
Living people
21st-century American philosophers
21st-century American non-fiction writers
Political philosophers
Philosophers of religion
Philosophy academics
University of Alabama in Huntsville alumni
Vanderbilt University alumni
Pepperdine University faculty
Lipscomb University faculty